Alvaro García (16 September 1894 – 22 September 1983) was a Mexican sports shooter. He competed in the 50 m rifle event at the 1936 Summer Olympics.

References

1894 births
1983 deaths
Mexican male sport shooters
Olympic shooters of Mexico
Shooters at the 1936 Summer Olympics
Sportspeople from Zacatecas